Rehman Baba Express is a passenger train operated daily by Pakistan Railways between Karachi and Peshawar. The train named after the Rehman Baba, who was a Sufi Dervish and poet. The Train was inaugurated on 23 December 2018 by former Minister for Railways Sheikh Rashid Ahmed at Peshawar Cantonment railway station.

Route
Karachi to Peshawar via Rohri, Multan, Faisalabad, Hafizabad, Wazirabad and Rawalpindi.

Accommodation
AC Business  AC Standard  Economy

Stops
 Karachi Cantonment
 Landhi Junction
 Hyderabad Junction
 Nawabshah Junction
 Padidan Junction
 Bhiria Road
 Mehrabpur Junction
 Rohri Junction
 Pano Akil
 Rahim Yar Khan
 Bahawalpur
 Multan Cantonment
 Toba Tek Singh
 Faisalabad
 Sangla Hill Junction
 Hafizabad
 Alipur Chatta
 Wazirabad Junction
 Lala Musa Junction
 Rawalpindi
 Attock Junction
 Jahangira Road
 Nowshera
 Peshawar City
 Peshawar Cantonment

References

Named passenger trains of Pakistan
Passenger trains in Pakistan